Omomyidae is a group of early primates that radiated during the Eocene epoch between about  (mya). Fossil omomyids are found in North America, Europe & Asia making it one of two groups of Eocene primates with a geographic distribution spanning holarctic continents, the other being the adapids (family Adapidae). Early representatives of the Omomyidae and Adapidae appear suddenly at the beginning of the Eocene (56 mya) in North America, Europe, and Asia, and are the earliest known crown primates.

Characteristics
 
Features that characterize many omomyids include large orbits (eye sockets), shortened rostra and dental arcades, loss of anterior premolars, cheek teeth adapted for insectivorous or frugivorous diets, and relatively small body mass (i.e., less than 500 g). Large orbits in genera such as Tetonius, Shoshonius, Necrolemur, and Microchoerus indicate that these taxa were probably nocturnal. At least one omomyid genus from the late Eocene of Texas (Rooneyia) had small orbits and was probably diurnal.

Like primates alive today, omomyids had grasping hands and feet with digits tipped by nails instead of claws, although they possessed toilet claws like modern lemurs. Features of their skeletons strongly indicate that omomyids lived in trees. In at least one genus (Necrolemur), the lower leg bones, the tibia and fibula, were fused as in modern tarsiers. This feature may indicate that Necrolemur leaped frequently. Most other omomyid genera (e.g., Omomys) lack specializations for leaping, and their skeletons are more like those of living dwarf and mouse lemurs.

Omomyid systematics and evolutionary relationships are controversial. Authors have suggested that omomyids are either: 
stem haplorhines [i.e., basal members of the group including living tarsiers and anthropoids].
stem tarsiiformes [i.e., basal offshoots of the tarsier lineage].
stem primates more closely related to adapids than to living primate taxa.

Recent research suggests the Omomyiformes are stem haplorhines, making them likely a paraphyletic grouping.

Attempts to link omomyids to living groups have been complicated by their primitive (plesiomorphic) skeletal anatomy. For example, omomyids lack the numerous skeletal specializations of living haplorhines. These haplorhine adaptations - absent in omomyids - include:
 significant reduction of the canal for the stapedial branch of the internal carotid artery.
 route of the canal to house the promontory branch of the internal carotid artery through the auditory bulla of the temporal bone, i.e. "perbullar"  (rather than across the promontory of tympanic cavity, "transpromontorial") .
 contact between the alisphenoid and zygomatic bones.
 presence of an anterior accessory cavity confluent with the tympanic cavity.

Omomyids further demonstrate a gap between the upper central incisors, which presumably indicates the presence of a rhinarium and philtrum to channel fluids into the vomeronasal organ. Omomyids as a group also lack most of the derived specializations of living tarsiers, such as extremely enlarged orbits (Shoshonius is a possible exception), a large supra-meatal foramen for an anastomosis between the posterior auricular and  middle meningeal circulation (again, Shoshonius is a possible exception, but the contents of the foramen in this extinct taxon are unknown), and extreme postcranial adaptations for leaping. 

Among primates, omomyids have a uniquely derived characteristic. This is the presence of an aphaneric (not visible or readily distinguishable, due to its position), or "intrabullar" (within the bullae), ectotympanic bone, connected to the lateral wall of the auditory bulla by an unbroken annular bridge.

Classification
 Family Omomyidae
 Altanius
 Kohatius
 Subfamily Anaptomorphinae 
 Tribe Trogolemurini
 Trogolemur
 Sphacorhysis
 Walshina
 Tribe Anaptomorphini
 Arapahovius
 Tatmanius
 Teilhardina
 Anemorhysis
 Chlororhysis
 Tetonius
 Pseudotetonius
 Absarokius
 Anaptomorphus
 Aycrossia
 Strigorhysis
 Mckennamorphus
 Gazinius
 Subfamily Microchoerinae 
 Indusomys
 Nannopithex
 Pseudoloris
 Necrolemur
 Microchoerus
 Vectipithex
 Melaneremia
 Paraloris
 Subfamily Omomyinae 
 Brontomomys
 Diablomomys
 Ekwiiyemakius
 Gunnelltarsius
 Huerfanius
 Mytonius
 Palaeacodon
 Tribe Rooneyini
 Rooneyia
 Tribe Steiniini
 Steinius
 Tribe Uintaniini
 Jemezius
 Uintanius
 Tribe Hemiacodontini
 Hemiacodon
 Tribe Omomyini
 Chumachius
 Omomys
 Tribe Macrotarsiini Yaquius Macrotarsius Tribe Washakiini
 Loveina Shoshonius Washakius Dyseolemur Tribe Utahiini
 Asiomomys Utahia Stockia Chipetaia Ourayia Wyomomys Ageitodendron''

References

External links
 “Adapidae and Omomyidae”
Mikko's Phylogeny page

Prehistoric primates
Eocene primates
Oligocene primates
Paleocene first appearances
Primate families
Oligocene extinctions
Prehistoric mammal families
Paraphyletic groups